This is a list of electoral results for the Electoral district of Gembrook in Victorian state elections.

Members for Gembrook

Election results

Elections in the 2010s

Elections in the 2000s

References

 

Victoria (Australia) state electoral results by district